WJXX (channel 25) is a television station licensed to Orange Park, Florida, United States, serving the Jacksonville area as an affiliate of ABC. It is owned by Tegna Inc. alongside NBC affiliate WTLV (channel 12). Both stations share studios on East Adams Street (near TIAA Bank Field) in downtown Jacksonville, while WJXX's transmitter is located on Anders Boulevard in the city's Killarney Shores section.

Though plans for an Orange Park television station dated to 1977 and the construction permit to 1988, it took upheaval in the city's ABC affiliation to induce the construction of channel 25, which began broadcasting in February 1997. The launch was two months ahead of schedule; final transmission facilities were not built out for another seven months, and signal issues alienated viewers in Jacksonville, a market already comparatively weak for the ABC network. Even though the founding owner, Allbritton Communications, built studios and started a local news team, WJXX made little headway in the ratings. The problems caused by the early launch proved insurmountable, leading Allbritton to sell WJXX to Gannett, owner of WTLV, just as common ownership of two stations in a market was permitted. Gannett merged the two stations at WTLV's studios in 2000 and began to simulcast nearly all local newscasts under the name First Coast News.

History

Early years
The FCC allocated the channel in January 1980, and in October, Clay filed an application for a construction permit to build the proposed station. Principals in Clay Television consisted of Richard Fellows, a former city manager in Green Cove Springs and Orange Park; his son; and three Clay County physicians and their wives. A second application was received for the channel in early 1981 from Orange Park Florida T.V., a company majority-owned by Malcolm Glazer.

In 1982, an FCC administrative law judge refused to grant the construction permit and returned both applications. Clay Television had experienced a cumulative change of 50 percent of ownership, which, per the judge, required refiling; Orange Park Florida T.V. was "basically and technically unqualified" because its antenna site did not meet minimum spacing requirements to other stations. The FCC then permitted Clay to cure the defect on its application, citing uncertainty about processing practices, and ultimately granted a construction permit in October 1982; the former action was vacated by the United States Court of Appeals for the District of Columbia Circuit in 1987 and remanded to the FCC. The FCC reviewed the action in 1988; deeming that continuing the lengthy comparative hearing was not in the public interest as Orange Park had continued to wait for new TV service, it upheld Clay's victory. As part of a sequential assignment of television station call signs across the United States in 1989, Clay Television received the call sign WYDP.

The station remained unbuilt due to financial difficulties. In December 1992, after offering WYDP to the Clay County school board, Clay Television filed to sell the construction permit to the University of North Florida. The university proposed to partner with public television station WJCT (channel 7) to build WYDP as a student-run TV station if the Florida Board of Regents would approve the financial outlay.

ABC upheaval
On February 16, 1996, Allbritton Communications Company announced it would purchase WBSG-TV (channel 21) in Brunswick, Georgia, north of Jacksonville in Glynn County, for $10.5 million. Allbritton simultaneously announced that its entire station group would either renew their existing ABC affiliations or—in the case of stations in Charleston, South Carolina; in and around Birmingham, Alabama; and WBSG-TV in Brunswick—switch to ABC. At the time, WBSG-TV operated as an affiliate of The WB and also had a news department producing local newscasts covering southeast Georgia, though it was not considered the WB affiliate of record in Jacksonville; the local newscasts had gone on the air with the station in April 1990 and been cut back to early and late evening airings by 1996. Allbritton announced that it would repurpose WBSG-TV as a full-market ABC affiliate for Jacksonville by building a full station facility there. The news blindsided WJKS (channel 17), which had served as the ABC affiliate for the First Coast from 1966 to 1980 and again since 1988. The switch was to occur on January 1, 1997, making the Jacksonville switch among the last in a years-long period of national affiliation realignment that had started in 1994.

However, WBSG-TV's transmission facility in Hickox, Georgia, did not provide sufficient coverage of Jacksonville, particularly homes south of Interstate 10. As a consequence, Allbritton filed to erect a new  tower in Kingsland, Georgia. WJKS attempted to block this move by making its own application for a tower in Kingsland, though it retracted this request; the FCC rejected WBSG's Kingsland proposal, leading Allbritton to instead increase the height and power of the existing WBSG-TV facility, though this did little to expand coverage to the south. By August 1996, when the FCC approved the upgraded Hickox facility, the affiliation switch had been put off until at least February, and WJKS had given up its fight to remain with ABC.

A date of April 1, 1997, was eventually fixed for WBSG-TV to assume the ABC affiliation in Jacksonville. However, those plans were changed in January 1997 when, with little warning, WJKS started extensive preemptions of ABC programs as part of its transition to become Jacksonville's affiliate of The WB. Of 22 prime time hours offered by ABC, WJKS was refusing to clear  hours as well as any new programs introduced by ABC; channel 17 aired the remainder, as well as ABC's network news and soap operas. The preempted shows were replaced with syndicated shows and programming from
The WB. Even though 70 percent of Jacksonville television households subscribed to cable, those that did not and could not receive WBSG-TV were at risk of losing all access to ABC network programming. The scramble to ensure the First Coast would retain access to ABC programming led ABC and Allbritton agreed to accelerate the switch from April 1 to February.

Allbritton reached a deal to resurrect the long-dormant WYDP license, which had been sold in the interim to WRP L.P., under a local marketing agreement and build an interim facility to provide network coverage to Jacksonville, particularly the southern and western portions of the market. 

On February 9, 1997, channel 25 came to air under new WJXX call letters. It became the third station in Jacksonville to affiliate with ABC; WTLV had carried the network from 1980 to 1988. Simultaneously, WBSG-TV joined ABC as a semi-satellite of WJXX. For viewers in Georgia dependent on the WBSG-TV transmitter, the switch went well; that station alone continued to air its regional newscasts. Viewers in the Jacksonville area relying on the interim WJXX installation from the final transmitter site, north of Lake Asbury, were greeted with a "patchy" signal; one cable company serving St. Augustine could not get a clean signal to feed to 24,000 subscribers. A direct link from WJXX to the primary cable company in Jacksonville was not established until December; the station was placed on channel 7 on cable systems, resulting in ingress issues with the over-the-air signal of WJCT on the same frequency and a poor picture even in cable households. Closed captioning was unavailable, even for ABC network programming, for nearly six months.

In April, Allbritton filed instead to buy WJXX outright while leasing WBSG-TV, paying $5 million for channel 25. The deal was concluded in September.

A dual construction project
The rush job of ensuring the partial continuity of ABC programming in the Jacksonville area was completed, leaving Allbritton with three remaining tasks: installing the permanent transmitter facility, constructing local studios, and hiring a news team. The former was finished first, but FCC authorization to activate the new antenna was delayed; pressure by local U.S. representative Tillie Fowler helped WJXX secure FCC authorization for its permanent facility in September, in time for the Jacksonville Jaguars' first home game on Monday Night Football.

Meanwhile, Allbritton acquired a parcel of land on A. C. Skinner Parkway, visible from J. Turner Butler Boulevard, to build a  studio facility. The site was designed to accommodate 100 employees, including a news staff of 60 to begin producing local newscasts for the First Coast. In the interim, a 7 p.m. magazine program, ABC 25 Tonight, began airing as the station's only local program.

On December 15, 1997, ABC 25 News debuted from the new studio with  hours each weekday of local news programming, most of it simulcast on WBSG-TV. Most of the anchors came from outside the market, having last worked in such markets as Orlando, Boston, and Atlanta; Donna Savarese moved from a job in Hartford, Connecticut, to work at WJXX. In March 1998, WBSG-TV ceased producing full-length 7 and 11 p.m. newscasts, with southeast Georgia news instead provided from Jacksonville as inserts into WJXX's newscasts; 11 jobs were lost.

In June 1998, ABC parent The Walt Disney Company entered into negotiations to purchase the eight Allbritton stations and the LMAs with WJXX and WJSU, reportedly offering the company more than $1 billion to acquire them. The sale would have made WJXX the first commercial station in Jacksonville to be an owned-and-operated station of a network. Negotiations between Disney and Allbritton broke down when the former dropped out of discussions to buy the stations the following month.

Allbritton faced a tough task establishing WJXX in the market. Due to the affiliation switch and construction of WJXX being brought forward to prevent ABC from losing much of the Jacksonville market for a two-month period, attention was diverted to the installation of temporary facilities. The seven months of inadequate transmitter coverage of Jacksonville and the even longer stretch without a direct feed to the cable company confused and alienated viewers just as channel 25 needed to make a good first impression. Furthermore, historically, ABC had usually not performed well in the Jacksonville market. In 2003, Charlie Patton, television editor for The Florida Times-Union, noted that "Jacksonville never acquired the ABC habit". Total-day ratings trailed the other major network stations in Jacksonville as well as WJKS—which had become WJWB, one of the nation's top WB affiliates—though they were on an upswing by the fall 1999–2000 television season. News ratings, despite a product considered superior to that WJKS had produced as an ABC affiliate, lagged longtime Jacksonville news leaders WJXT and WTLV; one bright spot was the market's only local newscast at 7 p.m.

Duopoly with WTLV
On November 15, 1999, the FCC legalized television station duopolies—the common ownership of two stations in one market. The next day, November 16, the Gannett Company, owner of WTLV, announced it would purchase WJXX from Allbritton. The deal was initiated after Allbritton approached Gannett about a possible sale. The new duopoly rules barred cross-ownership of two of the top four television stations in the same market, a restriction that typically prevented Big Four network affiliates from coming under common ownership. However, WJXX's fifth-place finish in total-day ratings allowed the deal.

The news came as a surprise to employees, who counted on Allbritton's commitment to building itself up in Jacksonville despite low ratings. It became apparent within a month that WTLV's recently expanded facilities and newsroom would form the core of the combined operation and that most of the combined operation's staffers would be WTLV holdovers. Staffers started to leave WJXX in numbers sufficient enough that WJXX's general manager, Lewis Robertson, warned that employees from other Allbritton stations might have to be seconded to Jacksonville to maintain station operations in the interim until Gannett took control.

The FCC approved the purchase on March 16, 2000. Gannett took control the next morning, and about 36 WJXX employees—including 13 in news—joined the new combined WTLV operation, which immediately began simulcasting newscasts on both stations before relaunching on April 27 under the umbrella brand of First Coast News. Newscasts continued to be broadcast at the same time on each station, including the WJXX 7 p.m. newscast. WBSG-TV was not included, and Allbritton converted it to programming from the Pax network; its owner, Paxson Communications Corporation, then purchased WBSG-TV, which is now WPXC-TV.

It took nearly two years for Gannett to dispose of the mothballed A. C. Skinner Parkway studio, with its prominent clock tower visible from Butler Boulevard. Two attempts to sell the property fell through before a consortium of investors acquired the building in 2002 and leased it to cellular company VoiceStream Wireless.

On June 29, 2015, the Gannett Company split into two separate companies, with one side specializing in print media and the other side specializing in broadcast and digital media. WJXX and WTLV—along with Gannett's other television station properties—were retained by the latter company, named Tegna.

News operation

Notable staff

Technical information

Subchannels
The station's digital signal is multiplexed:

Analog-to-digital conversion
On June 12, 2009, WJXX terminated its analog signal, on UHF channel 25, as part of the federally mandated transition from analog to digital television. The station's digital signal remained on its pre-transition VHF channel 10, using virtual channel 25.

Notes

References

External links
 

JXX
ABC network affiliates
Tegna Inc.
Television channels and stations established in 1997
1997 establishments in Florida
This TV affiliates
Quest (American TV network) affiliates
Ion Mystery affiliates
Twist (TV network) affiliates
TheGrio affiliates
Clay County, Florida
Former Gannett subsidiaries